Mahananda is a 2022 Indian Bengali-language biographical film directed by Arindam Sil. The film is produced by Firdausul Hasan and Probal Halder under the banner of Friends Communication. The film is based on the life and works of the eminent writer and socio-political activist Mahasweta Devi. The titular role is essayed by Gargi Roychowdhury.

Plot
Mohal Basu, an enthusiastic college student, wants to pursue her PhD research on the writer and socio-political activist Mahananda Bhattacharya. For that, she goes to Mahananda herself and a series of events occurs in their life which changes Mohal mentally.

Cast
 Gargi Roychowdhury as Mahananda Bhattacharya, an eminent writer and socio-political activist 
 Debshankar Haldar as Bidhan Bhattacharya, husband of Mahananda Bhattacharya 
 Ishaa Saha as Mohal Basu, a PhD scholar 
 Arno Mukhopadhyay as Bihan, Mohal's boyfriend

Soundtrack

All the songs are composed by Bickram Ghosh and the lyrics are penned by Subhendu Dasmunshi.

Release
The film was theatrically released on 8 April 2022.

Reception 
Mahananda has received mixed reviews, with critics praising its narrative structure and performances but criticizing the characterization of its protagonist. Sandipta Bhanja of The Indian Express wrote "The heart of this film is the music of Bickram Ghosh. Which gave another dimension to 'Mahananda'. Be it the use of Santali instruments in the background music or the song 'Rong Dhorese' sung by Sahana Bajpai. 'Mahananda' once again proved that Arindam-Bickram duo has undoubtedly set another milestone in Bengali cinema music. How did the indomitable struggle of a woman, the force of her mental strength put the ruling party in confusion? If you want to know then you can watch 'Mahananda' in theatres". Ranabir Bhattacharyya of Hindustan Times wrote "The early events of Mahananda's life are especially marked on the screen. Bijan Bhattacharya's conversation with Mahasweta Devi seems to be caught effortlessly in moments of humility like those of Mahananda and Bidhan Bhattacharya. In Arno Mukhopadhyay, Ishaa Saha also catches the eye with their easy chemistry. Bickram Ghosh's music scheme has given a worthy accompaniment. And of course Sahana Bajpaie's songs should not be missed!Sabarni Das' costume design is the asset of this movie".

References

External links
 

Bengali-language Indian films
2020s Bengali-language films